Ricky McCormick (born March 14, 1952) is an American water skier. He won 11 world titles, 37 national championships. He was awarded two gold medals for Water skiing at the 1972 Summer Olympics, though as it was a demonstration sport that year they are not included in the medal table. He came from a family of water skiers so started at age five. In 1982 he retired and in 1988 he was inducted into the Water Skiing Hall of Fame.

References 

American water skiers
Water skiers at the 1972 Summer Olympics
1952 births
Living people
Summer Olympics competitors for the United States